California's 10th State Assembly district is one of 80 California State Assembly districts.

District profile 
The district encompasses much of the North Bay and a small area of Wine Country. It forms the main corridor between the rest of the San Francisco Bay Area and the North Coast.

All of Marin County
 Belvedere
 Corte Madera
 Fairfax
 Larkspur
 Mill Valley
 Novato
 Ross
 San Anselmo
 San Rafael
 Sausalito
 Tiburon

Sonoma County – 44.1%
 Cotati
 Petaluma
 Santa Rosa – 44.2%
 Sebastopol
 Sonoma

Election results from statewide races

List of Assembly Members 
Due to redistricting, the 10th district has been moved around different parts of the state. The current iteration resulted from the 2011 redistricting by the California Citizens Redistricting Commission.

Election results 1992 - present

2020

2018

2016

2014

2012

2010

2008

2006

2004

2002

2000

1998

1996

1994

1992

See also 
 California State Assembly
 California State Assembly districts
 Districts in California

References

External links 
 District map from the California Citizens Redistricting Commission

10
Government of Marin County, California
Government of Sonoma County, California
Corte Madera, California
Larkspur, California
Mill Valley, California
Novato, California
Petaluma, California
San Anselmo, California
San Rafael, California
Santa Rosa, California
Sebastopol, California
Sonoma, California
Sausalito, California
Tiburon, California
Government in the San Francisco Bay Area